Vågstranda is a village along Romsdal Fjord in Rauma Municipality in Møre og Romsdal county, Norway. Vågstranda Church, built in 1870, is located in the village.

References

Rauma, Norway
Villages in Møre og Romsdal